The following article is a summary of the 2006–07 football season in Australia, which was the 2nd season following the formation of the A-League.

A-League

The 2006–07 A-League season began on 25 August 2006 and ended on 18 February 2007.

Regular season

Finals

A-League Pre-Season Challenge Cup

The 2006 A-League Pre-Season Challenge Cup began on 15 July 2006 and ended on 19 August 2006

Group stage

Group A

Group B

Finals

Asian Champions League

The 2006 AFC Champions League began on 7 March 2007 and ended on 14 November 2007. Adelaide United and Sydney FC represented Australia in the competition, 2005–06 A-League Premiers and Champions, respectively.

Adelaide United

Sydney FC

National teams

Men's senior

Friendlies
The following is a list of friendlies played by the men's senior national team in 2006–07.

AFC Asian Cup qualification

Men's under-23

Friendlies
The following is a list of friendlies played by the men's senior national team in 2006–07.

Olympic qualification

Men's under-20

Friendlies
The following is a list of friendlies played by the men's senior national team in 2006–07.

AFF U-20 Youth Championship

AFC Youth Championship

Women's senior

Friendlies
The following is a list of friendlies played by the women's senior national team in 2006–07.

AFC Women's Asian Cup

Olympic qualification

Women's under-20

FIFA U-20 Women's World Championship

Women's under-17

Friendlies
The following is a list of friendlies played by the women's under-17 national team in 2006–07.

AFC U-16 Women's Championship

Retirements
21 November 2006: Geoffrey Claeys, 32, former Belgium and Melbourne Victory defender.
16 May 2007: Carl Veart, 36, former Australia, Adelaide City and Adelaide United forward.
19 June 2007: John Crawley, 35, former Sydney United and Central Coast Mariners goalkeeper.
21 June 2007: Paul Okon, 35, former Australia, Marconi Stallions and Newcastle Jets defender.

References

External links
 Football Federation Australia official website

 
 
Seasons in Australian soccer
2006–07 in Australian women's soccer